Caladenia flavovirens, commonly known as the summer spider orchid, or the Christmas spider orchid is a plant in the orchid family Orchidaceae and is endemic to Victoria in Australia. It is a ground orchid with a single hairy leaf and one or two pale greenish-yellow flowers.

Description
The sepals and petals taper to brownish, thread-like tips. It is yellowish green with its maroon-coloured tip rolled under. There are many narrow thin teeth along the edges and four or six rows of red or yellow calli along its centre line. Flowering occurs from December to January.

Taxonomy and naming
Caladenia flavovirens was first formally described by Geoffrey Carr in 1991 from a specimen collected near Montrose. The description was published in Indigenous Flora and Fauna Association Miscellaneous Paper 1. The specific epithet (flavovirens) is from the Latin words flavus meaning “golden-yellow” or "yellow" and virens meaning "green".

Distribution and habitat
Summer spider orchid grows among shrubs in near-coastal areas and in open forest with grass or heath on mountains. It is only found in Victoria where it was once common but now rare and possibly extinct in areas near Portland, Lorne and Marlo.

Conservation
Caladenia flavovirens is listed as  "rare" in the Department of Environment and Primary Industries Advisory List of Rare Or Threatened Plants In Victoria.

References

flavovirens
Plants described in 1991
Endemic orchids of Australia
Orchids of Victoria (Australia)